Trinity School of Durham and Chapel Hill is a private, college preparatory, Independent, Christian school located in Durham, North Carolina in the United States.

About

Mission
The mission of Trinity School is to educate students in transitional kindergarten to grade twelve within the framework of Christian faith and conviction—teaching the classical tools of learning; providing a rich yet unhurried education; and communicating truth, goodness, and beauty.

Tuition
Trinity School relies on tuition income to meet most of its annual operating expenses.
Transitional Kindergarten–Kindergarten --> $5,900–$14,950
Grades 1–5 --> $8,200–$20,490
Grades 6–8 --> $9,200–$22,860
Grades 9–12	--> $10,900–$27,190

Religious policy
More than 70 local congregations of various denominations are represented in the student body at Trinity. Trinity does not require parents to be professing Christians and welcomes families and students from other faiths, as well as those from nonreligious backgrounds.

Accreditation
Trinity is accredited as a TK–12 institution by Christian Schools International (www.csionline.org) and the Southern Association of Independent Schools (www.sais.org). Trinity School is a member of the North Carolina Association of Independent Schools (www.ncais.org).

Athletics
The Trinity School Athletics program offers three seasons of interscholastic sports for students in grades 6–12. Their mascot is the Trinity Lion.

Fall
   Cross Country
   Soccer (boys)
   Tennis (girls)
   Volleyball (girls)

Winter
   Basketball
   Swim Team (state champions 2012)

Spring
   Baseball (boys)
   Golf
   Soccer (girls)
   Tennis (boys)
   Track and Field

References

External links
New Hope Creek Advisory Committee
North Carolina Association of Independent Schools

Christian schools in North Carolina
Private elementary schools in North Carolina
Private high schools in North Carolina
Nondenominational Christian schools in the United States
Private middle schools in North Carolina
Education in Durham, North Carolina
Schools in Durham County, North Carolina